Pinheiro's slender opossum (Marmosops pinheiroi) is an opossum species from South America. It is found in Brazil, French Guiana, Guyana, Suriname and Venezuela.

References

Opossums
Marsupials of South America
Fauna of northern South America
Mammals described in 1981